Ronnie Johncox (born February 13, 1969, Jackson, Michigan), is a professional racecar driver with over 200 wins.  He is a former driver in the Indy Racing League. He raced in the 1999-2000 seasons with 8 career starts.

His best career IRL finish was in 11th position in his first contest, the Longhorn 500 at Texas Motor Speedway. In 2002–2003, he stepped down to the Indy Pro Series, where he raced 10 times with one pole, three Top 5 finishes and eight Top 10s.  His last professional race was in the 2003 Freedom 100 at Indianapolis Motor Speedway.

He currently owns and operates Technique, Inc. which is a prototype metal stamping and laser cutting company based in Jackson, Michigan and Technique Engineered Chassis Components in Mooresville, NC that most notably produces "kits" to assemble the racing chassis of the NASCAR Car of Tomorrow.  Many of the top teams in NASCAR use Technique Engineered Chassis Components.

He is a graduate of Michigan State University.

IRL IndyCar Series

References

1969 births
Living people
IndyCar Series drivers
Indy Lights drivers
Michigan State University alumni
Sportspeople from Jackson, Michigan
Racing drivers from Michigan